Ughelli North is a Local Government Area of Delta State, Nigeria. Its headquarters is in the city of Ughelli.
 
It has an area of 818 km2 and a population of 321,028 at the 2006 census.

The postal code of the area is 333.

Notable towns in Ughelli North 

 Ughelli
 Orogun
 Agbarho
 Agbarha
 Ufuoma
 Oteri
 Evwreni
 Uduere

See also
Ughelli

References

Local Government Areas in Delta State